This is a list of films produced by the Ollywood film industry based in Bhubaneshwar and Cuttack in 2002:

A-Z

References

2002
Ollywood
2000s in Orissa
2002 in Indian cinema